Nasser-ud-daula Mu'in ad-Din Muhammad Ali Shah (1774 – May 7, 1842), was the third King of Oudh from 7 July 1837 to 7 May 1842.

Biography
Muhammad Ali Shah was son of Saadat Ali Khan II, brother of Ghazi-ud-Din Haidar Shah and uncle of Nasir-ud-Din Haidar Shah. He attained the throne with British help following the demise of his nephew, as opposed to the ex-queen mother's (Padshah Begum) attempts to nominate another successor, Munna Jan (the son child of Nasir-ud-Din Haider, whom his father had disavowed). Padshah Begum and Munna Jan were afterwards imprisoned by the British in the fort of Chunar. 

Muhammad Ali Shah of Oudh built the Shrine of Hurr at Karbala.

Death 
He died on 7 May 1842 AD.

Gallery

References

Notes

External links
 National Informatics Centre, Lucknow – Rulers of Awadh

Indian Shia Muslims
Nawabs of Awadh
1842 deaths
1777 births